Jonathan Zydko (born 12 January 1984 in Metz) is a French footballer who plays for UN Käerjéng 97. He is in his second spell with the club, and has also played for FC Metz, VfR Aalen and 1. FC Saarbrücken.

Honours 
 Regionalliga West (IV): 2010

References

External links 
 

1984 births
Living people
Footballers from Metz
French footballers
Association football defenders
3. Liga players
FC Metz players
VfR Aalen players
1. FC Saarbrücken players
UN Käerjéng 97 players
French expatriate sportspeople in Luxembourg
French expatriate sportspeople in Germany
French expatriate footballers
Expatriate footballers in Germany
Expatriate footballers in Luxembourg